Horacio Rodolfo López Usera (born 22 January 1961) is a Uruguayan athlete, basketball player, professor, journalist, writer, and former basketball player who competed in the 1984 Summer Olympics.

Books

References

External links

1961 births
Living people
Sportspeople from Montevideo
Uruguayan men's basketball players
Olympic basketball players of Uruguay
Basketball players at the 1984 Summer Olympics
Uruguayan male writers
Uruguayan autobiographers
Premio Bartolomé Hidalgo